Common names: Barbour's montane pitviper., Barbour's pit viper.

Mixcoatlus barbouri is a venomous pit viper species endemic to Mexico. No subspecies are currently recognized.

Etymology
The specific name, barbouri, is in honor of American herpetologist Thomas Barbour.

Description
Adults of M. barbouri generally grow to 30–40 cm (11¾-15¾ inches) in total length (including tail), with a maximum recorded total length of 51.0 cm (20 in). The species is terrestrial and moderately stout.

The color pattern consists of a blackish ground color, overlaid with a vague dorsal zig-zag stripe that extends down the flanks, which looks like a series of triangular markings. The skin between the scales is rust-colored, as are the sides of the head.

Geographic range
Mixcoatlus barbouri is found in the highlands of the Sierra Madre del Sur in the state of Guerrero, Mexico.

The type locality given is "Omilteme [or Omiltemi], Guerrero, Mexico".

Habitat
The preferred habitats of M. barbouri are mountain areas at some 9,000 feet (2,740 m) elevation in rocky pine forests and clearings with bunch grass.

Conservation status
The species M. barbouri is classified as Endangered (EN) on the IUCN Red List of Threatened Species with the following criteria: B1ab(iii) (v3.1, 2001). A species is listed as such when the best available evidence indicates that the geographic range, in the form of extent of occurrence, is estimated to be less than 5,000 km² (1,930 mi²), estimates indicate the population is severely fragmented or known to exist at no more than five locations, and a continuing decline has been observed, inferred or projected in the area, extent and/or quality of habitat. It is therefore considered to be facing a very high risk of extinction in the wild. The population trend is down. Year assessed: 2007.

References

Further reading
Dunn ER (1919). "Two New Crotaline Snakes from Western Mexico". Proceedings of the Biological Society of Washington 32: 213-216. (Lachesis barbouri, new species, pp. 213–214).

Crotalinae
Snakes of North America
Endemic reptiles of Mexico
Fauna of the Sierra Madre del Sur
Taxa named by Emmett Reid Dunn
Reptiles described in 1919